Susana Medina (31 January 1966) is an English-Spanish writer.

SUSANA MEDINA is the author of Philosophical Toys (Dalkey Archive Press), offspring of which are the short films Buñuel’s Philosophical Toys and Leather-bound Stories (co-directed with Derek Ogbourne); Red Tales Cuentos Rojos (Araña Editorial, bilingual ed. co-translated with Rosie Marteau); and Souvenirs del Accidente (Germanía). She has been awarded the Max Aub Short Story International Prize and an ACE Writing Grant for Spinning Days of Night. Her story ‘Oestrogen’ was published in Best European Fiction, 2014. Philosophical Toys  was selected by different critics in Best Books 2015: Top Ten Reads, 3:AM Magazine.

Medina's fiction has received accolades from The Times Literary Supplement, The Independent, The National, El País, as well as from Will Self and Deborah Levy.

Her work has been published in The Times Literary Supplement, The White Review, PEN, 3: AM Magazine, The Review of Contemporary Fiction, El País, El Europeo and Ajoblanco, and in anthologies from Dalkey Archive Press, Repeater Books and Shearman Books.
Susana has read her fiction at festivals including Estuary, Edinburgh Fringe, Stoke Newington, Port Eliot Lit, Cheltenham and universities such as Oxford, Goldsmiths and Birkbeck College. She won the 2012 Farrago Zoo Awards, Best Performance Working in English & Another Language, and her ‘Poem 66’ was the runner-up in Good Morning Menagerie International Translation Award, Colorado, 2016.

She is a climate activist, taking action and appearing on stages for Extinction Rebellion UK, including the legendary pink boat at Oxford Circus, Edinburgh Fringe and Writers Rebel's 40 Top Writers Marathon.  She is currently writing a related dialogue Rebel Rebel –An Emergency Dialogue with Roc Sandford.

Born in England to a German mother of Czech origin and a Spanish father, Susana's parents moved to Spain (Valencia) in 1968, where she was brought up. Having read on book covers that writers often lived elsewhere, she eloped to London when she was 19 years old. Fascinated by the city's mishmash of cultures and subcultures, she stayed on and studied History of Art and Italian at University College London, then lived for a year in Venice and Bologna where she studied at DAMS under Umberto Eco and Dario Fo. She holds a PhD in Spanish-Latin American Literature, and a Masters in Hispanic Studies from Birkbeck College. Borgesland, A voyage through the infinite, imaginary places, labyrinths, Buenos Aires and other psychogeographies and figments of space, her PhD thesis on imaginary spaces in the oeuvre of Jorge Luis Borges, was awarded in June 2006. She is an Associate Lecturer at the Open University.

Although more or less resident in London since 1987, for over two decades she contributed to prestigious Spanish publications and wrote her first books in Spanish, her native tongue. Trozos de Una (Chunks of One), an anti-novel written when she was 25 years old, was awarded a Generalitat Writing Grant. She has always written across a number of art forms, being interested in the gaps between the arts, genres and disciplines, the playful and the dead serious ("Coherence is often confused with homogeneity. In order to be coherent, art should shoot in all directions", she says in Souvenirs from the Accident). She has published a number of essays on literature, art, cinema and photography, written art catalogues, exhibited at Tate Modern and worked together with artists, the latest collaboration being a multi-media story Susana Medina: Object Lessons with Paul Louis Archer for El País. In 1992 and 1993, she curated various well received international art shows, notably Space International and Reproductions with artist Derek Ogbourne and John Russell (BANK), the catalogue for Space International soon becoming a legendary piece. She has also worked as a voluntary translator for English PEN, Writers in Prison Programme, and used to love doing pieces just for the web.

References

External links
 Tales, Art and the Philosophy of Rebellion, Leslie Tate, September 2020
 Sauna Series — Susana Medina, Interviews, Minor Lits, 12 December 2018
 66, Triumph of the Now, Scott Manley Hadley, 8 August
 Toys by Susana Medina, Triumph of the Now, Scott Manley Hadley, June
 Bowie Neurotransmitter, Silvia Rothlisberger, Literary South, April 2017	
 Bowie Neurotransmitter, Scott Manley Hadley, Triumph of the Now,  January 2017 
 ‘Susana Medina: Object Lessons,’ multi-media story and interview podcast by Paul Louis Archer, El País in English, 5 September 2016
  ‘Susana Medina answers questions about Philosophical Toys,’ interview podcast by Silvia Rothlisberger, Literary South
 Philosophical Toys chosen in Best Books 2015, The Top Ten Reads 2015, 3:AM Magazine, Fernando Sdrigotti
 Philosophical Toys chosen in Best Books 2015 The Top Ten Reads 2015 , 3:AM Magazine, Joanna Walsh
 ‘The Aleph in the Closet,’ Rosie Clark, Public Books Rosie Clark, 2015
Philosophical Toys by Susana Medina — Minor Literature (s), Tomoé Hill, 2015
 Philosophical Toys … & Connecting Neuro Clusters …, Susana Medina, Necessary Fiction, 18 September 
 Philosophical Toys, 3:AM Magazine, Richard Marshall
 ‘Philosophical Toys gives inanimate objects a life of their own’, Joanna Walsh, The National, 23 July
 On Susana Medina's PHILOSOPHICAL TOYS, Kirkus Reviews
 [Philosophical Toys by Susana Medina, European Literature Network]
 Serendipity, the V&A shoe show and … ‘Philosophical Toys’ by Susana Medina, European Literature Network
 Red Tales / Cuentos Rojos: a tale of two translators, Rosie Marteau, Minor Literature[s], 28 August

Arte en Movimiento, Lorenzo Hernández, Aurora Boreal, 2015, pp. 14–15

 Thursday Fiction Corner: The Dream World of Susana Medina, Cormac McGee, Columbia University Press Blog, 2014 
 European Fiction 2014, Jonathan Gibbs, Gorse
 London Review Bookshop Blog, 'A Kind of Permission': Short Stories for International Women'sDay, Joanna Walsh , 2014
 Week Links, Best European Friction, The Short Review, 2014
 Best European Fiction 2014, Preface by Drago Jancar – The Independent, Max Liu, Sunday 29 December 2013 
 Susana Medina Europe House Writing In 2 Languages, with Isabel del Río, introduced by Professor Amanda Hopkinson, 9 July, Internet Archive SoundCloud 
 Charla de Susana Medina en La Facultad de Bellas Artes de San Carles, SoundCloud, 2013 
 debunking the anxiety of influence, in conversation, by Joanna Pocock, 4 December 3:AM Magazine
 Susana Medina ‘El arte experimental es el modo de vivir muchas vidas e ir descubriendo tus propios límites,’ Marina Fernández, El Ibérico, abril 22
 Entrevista con Susana Medina, Juan Carlos Vásquez, herederos del k(c)aos, diciembre
 On Violence & Red Tales: An Interview with Susana Medina, Maxi Kim,  HTMLGIANT, 22 April
 ´La escritura y la lectura permiten conocer mundos y vivir vidas´ - Levante-EMV 
 [Twitter review of Susana Medina's Red Tales (with tweets), Fernando Sdrigotti Storify]
 [‘https://www.litromagazine.com/usa/2013/02/red-tales-cuentos-rojos-by-susana-medina/ Red Tales’, Joanna Pocock, Litro]
 ‘Experiencia Directa’, Germán Sierra, Quimera, Febrero, n. 351, 2012
 Entrevista a Susana Medina, David Burguera, Las Provincias, 15 noviembre 2011	
 ‘The Fetish Eye’. Richard Marshall, 3:AM Magazine
 ‘The interview! Susana Medina & Derek Ogbourne’, Silvia Terrón, 2010
 ‘Entrevista a Susana Medina’, Juan Carlos Vásquez, Herederos del Caos, 2010
 ‘Entrevista a Susana Medina’, Juan Carlos Vásquez, Herederos del Caos, 2009
 ‘Borgesland: An Interview with Susana Medina’, 3:AM Magazine, Andrew Stevens, 2006
 [‘Entrevista a Susana Medina: la coherencia multidireccional’, Qué Magazine, Ruben H y Mónica Bergos, 2006]
          	
‘Donde las mariposas revoletean’, La primera vez, ed. Esther Porta, Santillana: Aguilar, 2006, Marisol Laviño, p. 164

‘Voices from the Edge’, prologue by Juan Antonio Masoliver Ródenas, Souvenirs del Accidente,
Valencia: Editorial Germanía, Hoja por Ojo series, 2004, pp. 7–10

Una década del Premio Internacional de Cuentos Max Aub 1987–96, Marcelo Díaz García, 1998, p. 16

Nilo Casares ‘Duchamp ha muerto’, Ajoblanco, Enero 94, 1994, pp. 28–32

Enrique G. Aranda ‘Arte vivo en el Matadero’, Diario 16, 12 Sep 1993

Nilo Casares ‘Arte povera para un lugar sobrecogedor’, Postdata n32, 1993

‘13 artistas en el viejo matadero de Valencia’ El País, 13 Sep 1993

Rafa Marí ‘Arte en el Matadero’, Las Provincias, 3 Agosto, 1993

‘Arte de vanguardia: Acercamiento a la vida cotidiana’, Las Provincias, 12 Sep 1993

Eva Montesinos ‘Los okupas del arte’, Las Provincias, 19 Sep 1993

R.V.Meliá ‘El antiguo matadero exhibirá una muestra de arte’, El Levante, 9 Sep 1993

Carlos D. Marco ‘Una Manera de descentralizar el Arte’, Lápiz, Dic, pp. 66–69, 1992

Alison Sarah Jacques ‘Art is Alive and Well’, Flash Art, Nov/Dec VOL.XXV, 1992

E. Gonzalez, ‘Artistas muestran obras con animales’, El País, 30 Sept, 1992

Adrian Searle, ‘Space International’, Time Out, 30 Sep – 7 Oct 1992

Rafael Prats Rivelles ‘Space International’: Londres, 1a etapa, Levante, 23 Oct, p. 70, 1992

R.P.Rivelles ‘Todo lo que pasó en Londres’: Reproducciones. Levante, 13 Nov, p. 86, 1992

Imma Garín, ‘El Video’, La Cartelera, 104/20 al 26 Nov, p. 4, 1922

‘El Diente del Tiempo inaugura una muestra de vídeo’. Diario 16. 11 Nov, p. 41, 1992

TELEVISION & RADIO

‘Rebel Rebel, An Emergency Dialogue,’ with Roc Sandford, ’Resonance Extra FM, 25 September 2021

Interview about ‘Oestrogen,’ Best European Fiction 2014, RTER Radio 1, 2014

Excerpt from Philosophical Toys, Resonance FM appearance on The Late Breakfast Show, The Foundry. London, 2009

Interview with Canal 25 (in relationship with writing grant awarded by Generalitat de Valencia and International Short Story Prize Max Aub), August 1994

Television and radio interviews with TVE 1, Canal Plus, Antena 3, Canal 25, Radio 9, Onda 0 (in relationship with Space International), September 1993

1966 births
Living people
English women novelists
Spanish women writers
English women poets
British women essayists
English dramatists and playwrights